The Downtown Tuscaloosa Historic District is a historic district which was first listed on the National Register of Historic Places in 1986. It included a total of 91 buildings, with non-contributing buildings and ones deemed marginally contributing. The listing was expanded in 1989 with the addition of  including eight more contributing buildings.

The original district was roughly bounded by Fourth St., Twenty-second Ave., Seventh St., and Greensboro Ave. It includes the separately-NRHP-listed Bama Theatre-City Hall Building and City National Bank (1922).

References

External links

National Register of Historic Places in Tuscaloosa County, Alabama
Neoclassical architecture in Alabama
Late 19th and Early 20th Century American Movements architecture
Victorian architecture in Alabama